Kalabagan Cricket Academy (also known as Kala Bagan Cricket Academy) was a Bangladeshi cricket team that played List A cricket in the Dhaka Premier League from 2013–14 to 2015–16.

List A results
 2013-14: 9 matches, won 5, finished sixth
 2014-15: 16 matches, won 10, finished third
 2015-16: 11 matches, won 2, finished last
Sharifullah captained the team in 2013–14, Mahmudul Hasan and Anamul Haque in 2014–15, and Mahmudul Hasan in 2015–16.

Before the 2016–17 season the club was renamed "Rupganj Tigers". They compete under this name in the Dhaka First Division Cricket League, one level below List A status. While it no longer fields a professional team, the Kalabagan Cricket Academy continues to coach young players.

Records
In their List A matches Kalabagan Cricket Academy's highest score was 150 not out by Anamul Haque in 2014–15, and the best bowling figures were 6 for 43 by Sabbir Rahman in 2014–15.

References

External links
 Kalabagan Cricket Academy at CricketArchive

Dhaka Premier Division Cricket League teams
Former senior cricket clubs of Bangladesh